Frank A. Vogel (1888–1951) was an American banker and chief political advisor of Governor William Langer. Vogel was born in Minnesota in 1888 to Abraham and Sarah Jane (Taylor) Vogel. He moved to North Dakota around 1909, where he was a teacher and school administrator in the small towns of Anamoose, Underwood and Dazey. He married Louella Larsen and, in 1917, purchased the bank in Coleharbor.

Political career 
Vogel successfully ran for the North Dakota Legislature in 1921 as a member of the Nonpartisan League. He was re-elected in 1923 and 1925 and, during that last session, was elected floor leader for NPL legislators.

Because of Vogel's strong support among farmers, Langer made Vogel his chief advisor as he prepared to run for governor. Langer was elected governor in 1932.

In January 1933, Vogel was appointed State Tax Commissioner, and on March 15, 1933, named State Highway Commissioner.

Langer appreciated Vogel's "liberal political philosophy, his administrative ability, and his judgment." Vogel was not a "yes" man, and frequently challenged Langer's decisions. Shortly after he assumed office, Langer started encouraging all state employees to sell subscriptions to his newspaper, The Leader. Vogel thought it was a "rotten" idea and told Langer, but the governor didn't listen. Because it appeared the money collected was used for personal and political purposes, an investigation was begun in March 1934.

In the spring, a federal grand jury indicted Langer, Vogel and seven others on charges of soliciting and collecting money from federal employees for political purposes and of conspiring to obstruct the orderly operation of an act of Congress. Langer, Vogel and three other Langer appointees were found guilty on June 17. Vogel was sentenced to federal prison for 13 months and fined $3,000. He, Langer and the others appealed their convictions, and after three more trials, Langer and Vogel were cleared of all charges.

Later, Vogel became the President of The Bank of North Dakota. During Vogel's eight years as President of the State Bank, total resources climbed from $23 million to $78 million. Perhaps the most lasting legacy left by Vogel was the student loan program he created with his associate, Martin Stenehjem.

Children 
One of Vogel's five son, Robert Vogel, was U.S. attorney and a justice of the North Dakota Supreme Court. Another son, William (Bill) Vogel was an attorney in Salt Lake City. Another of his sons, Frank Vogel, fell during WWII in the Invasion of Normandy. His granddaughter, Sarah Vogel, became the country's first female State Agriculture Commissioner when she was elected in 1988 in North Dakota. His grandson, Frank E. Vogel, founded the Islamic Legal Studies program at Harvard Law School.

References

American bankers
People from Minnesota
1888 births
1951 deaths